47 (forty-seven)  is the natural number following 46 and preceding 48. It is a prime number.

In mathematics
Forty-seven is the fifteenth prime number, a safe prime, the thirteenth supersingular prime, the fourth isolated prime, and the sixth Lucas prime. Forty-seven is a highly cototient number. It is an Eisenstein prime with no imaginary part and real part of the form .

It is a Lucas number. It is also a Keith number because its digits appear as successive terms earlier in the series of Lucas numbers: 2, 1, 3, 4, 7, 11, 18, 29, 47, ...

It is the number of trees on 9 unlabeled nodes.

Forty-seven is a strictly non-palindromic number.

Its representation in binary being 101111, 47 is a prime Thabit number, and as such is related to the pair of amicable numbers {17296, 18416}.

In science
 47 is the atomic number of silver.

Astronomy
 The 47-year cycle of Mars: after 47 years – 22 synodic periods of 780 days each – Mars returns to the same position among the stars and is in the same relationship to the Earth and Sun. The ancient Mesopotamians discovered this cycle. 
 Messier object M47, a magnitude 4.5 open cluster in the constellation Puppis
47 Tucanae,  the second brightest globular cluster in the sky, located in the constellation Tucana.
 The New General Catalogue object NGC 47, a barred spiral galaxy in the constellation Cetus. This object is also designated as NGC 58.

In popular culture

Pomona College

Calendar years
 47 BC
 AD 47

See also
 List of highways numbered 47

Other
Telephone dialing country code for Norway
The AK-47, also known as a Kalashnikov rifle, is one of the most widely used military weapons in the world.
The CH-47 Chinook, a helicopter.
47 is the number of the French department Lot-et-Garonne.
The P-47 Thunderbolt was a fighter plane in World War II.
 There are Forty-seven Ronin in the famous Japanese story.
 There are 47 Prefectures of Japan.
 The player protagonist of the Hitman video game franchise is called Agent 47.

References

Integers
In-jokes